Lee Du-yeon (born 9 April 1975) is a South Korean hurdler. He competed in the men's 400 metres hurdles at the 2000 Summer Olympics.

Lee attended South Chungcheong Sports High School. He represented his school at the 74th Korean National Sports Festival in 1993, where he came in first place and set the festival record in the high school men's 400 metres hurdles with a time of 52.97 seconds. He went on to attend Sungkyunkwan University, and while a student there came in first place at the 51st National Track Championships in 1997 in the men's 400 metres hurdles with a time of 51.64 seconds. By 1999 he was in mandatory military service, and competed at the 53rd National Track Championships as a member of the Korea Armed Forces Athletic Corps, again taking 1st place with a time of 50.79 seconds. He was living in Seocheon County, South Chungcheong Province when he was chosen for the South Korean team at the 2000 Summer Olympics.

After retiring from competition, in 2008 he founded the Nonsan municipal employees' track team and became its first coach, eventually leading them to victory at the 24th National Workplace Teams Track Competition in 2012. He later became the track coach at his alma mater Sungkyunkwan University. In 2017 the Gyeonggi Provincial Track Federation. honoured him with the "best coach" award.

Notes

References

1975 births
Living people
Athletes (track and field) at the 2000 Summer Olympics
South Korean male hurdlers
Olympic athletes of South Korea
Place of birth missing (living people)
Sungkyunkwan University alumni
Athletes (track and field) at the 2002 Asian Games
Asian Games competitors for South Korea